Ivano Miguel Newbill (born December 12, 1970 in Sedalia, Missouri) is a retired professional basketball forward who played three seasons in the National Basketball Association (NBA) as a member of the Detroit Pistons (1994–95), the Atlanta Hawks (1996–97) and the Vancouver Grizzlies (1997–98). He attended the Georgia Institute of Technology.

External links

1970 births
Living people
American expatriate basketball people in Canada
American men's basketball players
Atlanta Hawks players
Basketball players from Missouri
Georgia Tech Yellow Jackets men's basketball players
Detroit Pistons players
Grand Rapids Mackers players
Sportspeople from Sedalia, Missouri
Power forwards (basketball)
Small forwards
Undrafted National Basketball Association players
Vancouver Grizzlies players